Monument Square is a town square located in downtown Portland, Maine, about halfway between the East Bayside and Old Port neighorhoods. The Time and Temperature Building, Fidelity Trust Building, and the main branch of the Portland Public Library are on Congress Street across from the square, while One Monument Square and One City Center are among a number of buildings located on the square.

Portland Soldiers and Sailors Monument

The Portland Soldiers and Sailors Monument is located in the center of Monument Square, on the former site of Portland's 1825 city hall.  It was dedicated on October 28, 1891 and honors "those brave men of Portland, soldiers of the United States army and sailors of the navy of the United States, who died in defense of the country in the late civil war".  Also known as "Our Lady of Victories", it is a bronze statue mounted on a granite base, depicting a female figure, clad in armor covered by flowing robes, with a furled flag in one hand and a mace and shield in the other.  The figure is an allegorical representation of Victory.  On two sides of the base stand bronze groups of three figures, one depicting soldiers, and the other sailors.

The sculpture was created by Maine sculptor Franklin Simmons and the base was designed by New York City architect Richard Morris Hunt.  The site's original landscaping, now substantially altered, was by Portland architect Francis H. Fassett.  Its creation was made possible by fundraising activities of the local Grand Army of the Republic lodge.  It was added to the National Register of Historic Places on April 1, 1998.

1825 city hall

Before it incorporated as a city in 1832, the Town of Portland built its first town hall in 1825. Over the building's sixty-three years it was also known as Market Hall and Military Hall. The original simple gable structure was modified in 1833 by Charles Quincy Clapp, who had the cupola removed from the roof and a portico added to the front, updating the building to the Greek Revival style. 

In 1827, the upper floor housed the second public gymnasium in the US, founded by eccentric and influential writer, critic, and activist John Neal. The gym was based on Turnen gymnastics that Neal learned in London from German refugee Carl Voelker. The first floor in the building's early years housed stalls used by farmers to sell agricultural products. The building was the site of the Portland Rum Riot in 1855, involving Mayor Neal Dow and resulting in one death. It was replaced by a new city hall in 1862 on Congress Street at the head of Exchange Street. The old city hall was demolished in 1888 and replaced by the Soldiers and Sailors Monument, at which time Market Square was renamed Monument Square.

See also
National Register of Historic Places listings in Portland, Maine

References

Citations

Sources

External links

 Monument Square, Portland, ca. 1950 MaineMemory.net
 Monument Square Portland Landmarks

Monuments and memorials in Portland, Maine
Monuments and memorials on the National Register of Historic Places in Maine
National Register of Historic Places in Portland, Maine
Public art in Portland, Maine
Union (American Civil War) monuments and memorials in Maine